Que Nada Nos Separe (English: May Nothing Tear Us Apart) is the sixth studio album by Mexican pop singer Mijares. This album was released in 1991 earning 6 Gold discs.

History
This disc, produced by Omar López, has songs from the songwriters Alejandro Lerner, Alejandro Filio and Marco Flores, among others. Several of his greatest hits are from this album.

Track listing
Tracks :
 Cuando te hago el amor - 3:35
 Un amor por llegar - 4:18
 Que nada nos separe - 4:20
 Luna llena - 3:52
 En carne viva - 3:47
 Buena fortuna - 3:36
 No hace falta - 4:33
 Persona a persona - 4:11
 Bonita - 4:20
 Me cuesta trabajo - 4:52
 Desnuda - 4:20

Singles
 Que nada nos separe
 No hace falta
 Persona a persona

Single Charts

Album Charts
The album reached the 13th position in Billboard Latin Pop Albums.

1991 albums
Manuel Mijares albums